Excess All Areas is a live album and a video release by German hard dance group Scooter released on 2 June 2006 chronicling the final show of the band's Who's Got the Last Laugh Now? Tour which was held on 26 March 2006 at Alsterdorfer Sporthalle (Hamburg, Germany). The concert film was directed by Tim Tibor and Andreas Bardét, who previously directed a music video for One (Always Hardcore).

Track listing

CD / Web 
 "Intro" – 2:40
 "Hello! (Good To Be Back)" – 3:46
 "I'm Raving" – 4:39
 "Apache Rocks The Bottom!" – 4:49
 "The Leading Horse" – 3:20
 "Shake That!" – 4:13
 "Panties Wanted" – 5:07
 "Weekend!" – 3:34
 "Stripped" – 4:21
 "Maria (I Like It Loud)" – 4:48
 "The Chaser / Jigga Jigga!" – 6:39
 "Nessaja" – 3:41
 "One (Always Hardcore)" – 5:15
 "Fire" – 4:16
 "Hyper Hyper" – 5:53
 "Move Your Ass!" – 5:33

DVD

DVD1: Live In Concert 
 "Intro" – 2:56
 "Hello! (Good To Be Back)" – 4:16
 "I'm Raving" – 4:05
 "Apache Rocks The Bottom!" – 5:17
 "The Leading Horse" – 4:39
 "Shake That!" – 4:09
 "Panties Wanted" – 5:17
 "Weekend!" – 4:16
 "Stripped" – 4:20
 "Maria (I Like It Loud)" – 4:46
 "The Chaser / Jigga Jigga!" – 7:21
 "Faster Harder Scooter" – 4:49
 "Nessaja" – 3:43
 "One (Always Hardcore)" – 5:37
 "Fire" – 7:23
 "How Much Is The Fish?" – 4:55
 "Hyper Hyper" – 5:45
 "Move Your Ass" – 8:21

Extras:
 Backstage report
 On stage perspective on selected tracks
 Fan interviews
 Tour diary

DVD2: The Videos 
 "Apache Rocks The Bottom!" – 3:47
 "Hello! (Good To Be Back)" – 3:33
 "Suavemente" – 3:40
 "One (Always Hardcore)" – 3:55
 "Shake That!" – 3:24
 "Jigga Jigga!" – 3:59
 "Maria (I Like It Loud)" – 3:42
 "The Night" – 3:41
 "Weekend!" – 3:36
 "Nessaja" – 3:29
 "The Logical Song" – 3:58
 "Aiii Shot The DJ" – 3:31
 "Posse (I Need You On The Floor)" – 3:45
 "She's The Sun" – 4:01
 "I'm Your Pusher" – 3:50
 "Fuck The Millennium" – 4:12
 "Faster Harder Scooter" – 3:43
 "Call Me Mañana" – 3:31
 "I Was Made For Lovin' You" – 3:32
 "We Are The Greatest" – 3:28
 "How Much Is The Fish?" – 3:46
 "No Fate" – 3:42
 "The Age of Love" – 4:06
 "Fire" – 3:31
 "Break It Up" – 3:38
 "I'm Raving" – 3:35
 "Rebel Yell" – 3:44
 "Let Me Be Your Valentine" – 3:48
 "Back In The U.K." – 3:24
 "Endless Summer" – 3:26
 "Friends" – 3:36
 "Move Your Ass!" – 3:30
 "Hyper Hyper" – 3:35
 "One (Always Hardcore) (Rick J Jordan's Director's Cut)" – 3:52

Extras:
 Band commentary on all videos
 Making offs

Credits and personnel 
Credits adapted from Excess All Areas liner notes.
H.P. Baxxter – vocals, MC lyrics, producer, performer, programmer
Rick J. Jordan – keyboards, drums, mixer, engineer, producer, performer, programmer
Jay Frog – keyboards, drums, producer, performer, programmer
Jeff "Mantas" Dunn - electric guitar
Louis C. Oberlander - mixer, engineer
Jens Thele – management

Charts (Live album)

References

External links 
 

Scooter (band) albums
2006 live albums
2006 video albums
Live video albums